The Department of Markets was an Australian government department that existed between April 1930 and April 1932. It was the second so-named Australian Government department.

Scope
Information about the department's functions and/or government funding allocation could be found in the Administrative Arrangements Orders, the annual Portfolio Budget Statements and in the department's annual reports.

At its creation, the department was responsible for the following:
Advances for purchase of wire and wire netting to settlers assisting the following organizations:
Australian Dairy Council
Australian Maize Council
Australian Pig Industry Council
Canned Fruit Export Control Board
Dairy Produce Export Control Board
Dried Fruits Export Control Board
Wine Overseas Marketing Board
Australian National Travel Association
Board of Trade
Collection and dissemination of commercial and industrial information 
Film publicity
Inspection, grading, packing and marketing of butter, cheese and other dairy produce, meat, fresh, dried and canned fruits, seeds, vegetables, honey, jams, etc. exported from the Commonwealth
Representation on international exhibitions
Rural credits
Trade publicity and advertising in the United Kingdom and other overseas countries
Trade representation abroad

Structure
The department was a Commonwealth Public Service department, staffed by officials who were responsible to the Minister for Markets, Parker Moloney until January 1932 and then Charles Hawker.

The Secretary of the Department was Edward Joseph.

References

Ministries established in 1930
Markets